Sheikh Azizur Rahman (known as Shawkat Osman; 2 January 1917 – 14 May 1998) was a Bangladeshi novelist and short story writer. He won the Bangla Academy Literary Award in 1962, the Ekushey Padak in 1983 and the Independence Day Award in 1997.

Early life and education
Osman was born in Sabalsinghapur, Hughli, West Bengal. Osman was educated at the Aliah University, and at the St. Xavier's College, Calcutta from where he graduated in 1938. He then earned his master's in Bengali literature from the University of Calcutta in 1941.

Career
Osman migrated to East Pakistan (present-day Bangladesh) after the partition of India in 1947. He started teaching at Chittagong Commerce College. He then served as a faculty member at Dhaka College during 1959–1972.

Literature
Osman's first prominent novel was Janani, a portrait of the disintegration of a family because of the rural and urban division. In Kritadasher Hashi (Laugh of a Slave), Osman explored the darkness of contemporary politics and reality of dictatorship.

Family
Osman's son Yafes Osman is the incumbent Science and Technology minister of Bangladesh.

Awards
 Bangla Academy Literary Award (1962)
 Adamjee Literary Award (1966)
 President Award (1967)
 Ekushey Padak (1983)
 Mahbubullah Foundation Prize (1983)
 Muktadhara Literary Award (1991)
 Independence Day Award (1997)

Literary works

Novels

Short stories

Dramas

Memoires

 Kalratri Khandachitra (1986)
 Swajan Sangram (1986)

Children literature

Translation

Editor

Non-fiction

References

1917 births
1998 deaths
People from Hooghly district
University of Calcutta alumni
Recipients of the Ekushey Padak
Recipients of the Independence Day Award
Academic staff of Dhaka College
Recipients of Bangla Academy Award
Bengali novelists
Bangladeshi male novelists
Novelists from West Bengal
Recipients of the Adamjee Literary Award
Writers from West Bengal